Tiffany (also Shopiere Depot or Shopiere Station) is an unincorporated community located in the towns of La Prairie and Turtle, Rock County, Wisconsin, United States.

References

External links

Unincorporated communities in Rock County, Wisconsin
Unincorporated communities in Wisconsin